Bryan Keith Cox Jr. (born June 25, 1994) is an American football defensive end who is a free agent. He played college football at Florida.

High school career
A three-star prospect according to ESPN, Scout.com and Rivals.com. Rated the No. 66 player in the state of Florida and the No. 37 strongside defensive end in the country by Rivals.com.

College career
After playing a reserve role as a freshman (eight games, five tackles, two sacks), he won a starting job in 2014 (29 tackles, six for loss, four sacks). Despite having hip surgery after the regular season that year, Cox came back to start 12 games as a junior, setting career highs in tackles (45), tackles for loss (10.5), and forced fumbles (two). Also, finishing the year one sack short of a new career high. Injuries limited his effectiveness in 2016, allowing him to only make 19 tackles (2.5 for loss, 0.5 sack) in 11 games.

Professional career

Carolina Panthers
Cox signed with the Carolina Panthers as an undrafted free agent following the 2017 NFL Draft. He was waived on September 2, 2017, and signed to the Panthers' practice squad the next day. He was promoted to the active roster on September 30, 2017.

Cox was waived during final roster cuts on August 31, 2019, and was signed to the practice squad the next day. He was promoted to the active roster on October 1, 2019. He was waived on November 8.

Cleveland Browns
Cox was signed by the Cleveland Browns on November 13, 2019.

Buffalo Bills
Cox was signed by the Buffalo Bills on April 29, 2020. He was waived on September 5, 2020, and signed to the practice squad the next day. He was elevated to the active roster on October 19 for the team's week 6 game against the Kansas City Chiefs, and reverted to the practice squad after the game. On January 26, 2021, Cox signed a reserves/futures contract with the Bills. He was placed on injured reserve with an Achilles' tendon injury on June 22, 2021.

Indianapolis Colts
Cox signed with the Indianapolis Colts on June 12, 2022. He was released on July 29, 2022.

Personal life
He is the son of three-time Pro Bowler linebacker Bryan Cox.

References

External links
Florida Gators bio

1994 births
Living people
Players of American football from Fort Lauderdale, Florida
Players of American football from St. Louis
Florida Gators football players
Carolina Panthers players
Buffalo Bills players
American football defensive ends
St. Thomas Aquinas High School (Florida) alumni
Cleveland Browns players
Indianapolis Colts players